Henry Archer (1799 – 2 March 1863) was the son of an Irish landowner. He attended Trinity College, Dublin. He was called to the Irish Bar and spent most of his time between North Wales and London.

Ffestiniog Railway 

In railway circles, Archer is known mostly for the Ffestiniog Railway, which was the major work of his life, a fiery temper, a large frame and an even larger personality. A few recall his long running but fruitless championship of the various Porth Dinllaen railway and harbour projects.

The Ffestiniog slate industry should be grateful to Henry Archer for being in the right place at the right time. It was at the Penygroes Inn in 1829 that Archer met Samuel Holland Jnr., of Rhiwbryfdir slate mine at Blaenau Ffestiniog who was returning from Caernarfon where he banked with Williams and Co. He had travelled between Caernarfon and Penygroes as a passenger on the horse drawn Nantlle Tramway and had called at the Inn for a cup of tea before collecting his horse and riding home.

In conversation, Archer expressed an interest in the Nantlle Railway that was apparently quietly seeking a purchaser. Holland, it is said, suggested that Archer should leave Nantlle to its fate and turn his energies to building a proper railway from Ffestiniog to Porthmadog. A detailed discussion followed and Archer became involved with Holland in the promotion of the Ffestiniog Railway Company.

It was left to Archer as the Managing Director designate to raise the initial capital of £24,185 largely on the Dublin Stock Exchange (including £11,905 of his own money). He was the driving force also in steering the bill through Parliament and in managing the company during construction and through its early years when Archer had to persuade a suspicious slate industry to entrust its slate transport to a railway. Archer quarrelled with his fellow directors, with the Oakeley Estate and with James Spooner and was less active in FR company affairs after the railway opened. In 1836 he sued the FR company for his salary and received a substantial settlement. Nominally he remained as Managing Director until 1856 and as a director until 1860, when the FR Co. gave him a pension of £100 per annum as the originator of the FR and for devoting many years to its service.

Philately 

Philatelists know Henry Archer as the inventor of the first postage stamp perforating machine, which he patented in 1848, to facilitate stamp separation. Following the successful Prince Consort Essay trials in 1853, he sold his copyright and patents to the Postmaster General for £4,000. In early trials, his alternative Archer Roulette machines failed to work well.

Archer died at Pau, Pyrénées-Atlantiques, France on 2 March 1863.

References

External links
The Ffestiniog Railway Company's website

1799 births
1863 deaths
Irish barristers
Irish inventors
19th-century Irish businesspeople
Alumni of Trinity College Dublin
Ffestiniog Railway
Postal pioneers